The Gentle Gunman is a 1952 British drama film directed by Basil Dearden and starring John Mills, Dirk Bogarde and Elizabeth Sellars. The film is based on a 1950 play of the same title by Roger MacDougall that was televised by the BBC in September 1950. It was produced by Ealing Studios. The film's sets were designed by the art director Jim Morahan.

Plot
Terence (John Mills) and Matthew (Dirk Bogarde) Sullivan are two IRA men in London during World War II. Terry starts questioning the worth of the IRA's war against the United Kingdom that involves planting bombs in a crowded London Underground station and becomes marked for death by the IRA. In addition to Terry's questioning of the IRA's methods, Matt is affected by a mother whose husband and son had joined the IRA with fatal results.  Though Matthew escapes capture in London, his comrades-in-arms Connolly (Liam Redmond) and Patsy (Jack MacGowran) are captured by the British police.  Both Terry and the IRA leader Shinto (Robert Beatty) vow to free the men and take them from their trial in Belfast to safety in the Republic of Ireland, but Shinto favours more violent methods than Terry.

Cast

John Mills as Terence Sullivan
Dirk Bogarde as Matt Sullivan
Robert Beatty as Shinto
Elizabeth Sellars as Maureen Fagan
Barbara Mullen as Molly Fagan
Eddie Byrne as Flynn  
Joseph Tomelty as Dr Brannigan  
Gilbert Harding as Henry Truethome  
James Kenney as Johnny Fagan  
Liam Redmond as Connolly
Michael Golden as Murphy
Jack MacGowran as Patsy McGuire
Terence Alexander as Ship's Officer (uncredited)
Patric Doonan as Sentry (uncredited)

Critical reception
The British magazine Time Out thought the film was "stiff" and "overplotted", while the British Film Institute thought the film struggled to "find the right tone" and culminated with a "car-crash of an ending". The New York Times thought that the film had "failed to search beneath the surface" of the screen-play and described much of the content as "superficial".

Quotes
Englishman: "The situation in England is serious, but it's never hopeless"
Irishman: "The situation in Ireland is hopeless but it's never serious"

References

External links

1952 films
1952 drama films
British black-and-white films
British drama films
Ealing Studios films
Films about the Irish Republican Army
Films directed by Basil Dearden
Films set in Belfast
Films set in London
British films based on plays
Films set on the home front during World War II
1950s English-language films
1950s British films